Eric Laurentius Gouka (born 29 January 1970 in Schiedam, South Holland) is a former Dutch cricketer. He played three One Day Internationals for The Netherlands.

References
 Cricinfo page on Erik Gouka

1970 births
Living people
Dutch cricketers
Netherlands One Day International cricketers
Sportspeople from Schiedam